Adolfo de Jesús Constanzo (November 1, 1962 – May 6, 1989) was a Cuban-American serial killer, drug dealer and alleged cult leader who led an infamous drug-trafficking and occult gang in Matamoros, Tamaulipas, Mexico, that was dubbed the Narcosatanists (Spanish: Los Narcosatánicos) by the media. His cult members nicknamed him The Godfather (El Padrino). Constanzo led the cult with Sara Aldrete, whom followers nicknamed "The Godmother" (La Madrina). The cult was involved in multiple ritualistic killings in Matamoros, including the murder of Mark Kilroy, an American student abducted, tortured and killed in the area in 1989.

Early life 
Adolfo Constanzo was born in Miami, Florida, to Delia Aurora González, a Cuban immigrant in 1962. She gave birth to Adolfo at the age of 15 and eventually had three children, by different fathers. Delia moved to San Juan, Puerto Rico, after her first husband died and remarried there. Constanzo was baptized Catholic and served as an altar boy, but also accompanied his mother on trips to Haiti to learn about Vodou.

Constanzo's family returned to Miami in 1972 and his stepfather died soon after, leaving the family with some money. As a teenager, he became apprenticed to a local sorcerer and began to practice a religion called Palo Mayombe, which involves animal sacrifice. Delia remarried and his new stepfather was involved in both the religion and drug dealing. Constanzo and his mother were arrested numerous times for theft, vandalism and shoplifting. He graduated from high school, but was expelled from prep school.

As an adult, Constanzo moved to Mexico City and met the men who were to become his followers: Martín Quintana, Jorge Montes and Omar Orea. They began to run a profitable business casting spells to bring good luck, which involved expensive ritual sacrifices of chickens, goats, snakes, zebras and even lion cubs. Many of his clients were rich drug dealers and hitmen who enjoyed the violence of Constanzo's "magical" displays. He also attracted other rich members of Mexican society, including several high-ranking corrupt policemen who introduced him to the city's powerful drug cartels. His cult was said to be associated with the notable Gulf Cartel.

Constanzo started to raid graveyards for human bones to put in his nganga, or cauldron. Before long, his cult decided that the spirits of the dead that resided in the nganga would be stronger (providing the cult more powerful protection) with live human sacrifices instead of old bones. The resulting killings soon totaled more than twenty victims, whose mutilated bodies were found in and around Mexico City. This process escalated until Constanzo eventually decided that the gang needed the power of a brain from an American student, culminating with the 1989 murder of Mark Kilroy.

Murders 
Constanzo began to believe that his magic, much of which he took from Palo Mayombe, was responsible for the success of the cartels and demanded to become a full business partner with one of the most powerful families he knew, the Calzadas. When his demand was rejected, seven family members disappeared. Their bodies turned up later with fingers, toes, ears, brains and even (in one case) the spine missing. Constanzo soon made friends with a new cartel, the Hernandez brothers. He also took up with a young woman named Sara Aldrete, who became the high priestess of the cult. Constanzo made Aldrete second-in-command of his cult and directed her to supervise his followers while he was shipping marijuana over the border into the US.

In 1988, Constanzo moved to Rancho Santa Elena, a house in the desert. It is there where he carried out more sadistic ritual murders, sometimes of strangers and other times of rival drug dealers. He also used the ranch to store huge shipments of cocaine and marijuana.

On March 13, 1989, Constanzo's henchmen abducted a pre-med student, Mark Kilroy, from outside a Mexican bar and took him back to the ranch. Kilroy was a US citizen who had been in Mexico on spring break. When Kilroy was brought to the ranch, Constanzo murdered him. Under pressure from Texan politicians, Mexican police initially picked up four of Constanzo's followers, including two of the Hernandez brothers. Police quickly discovered the cult and that Constanzo had been responsible for Kilroy's death; he sought a "good"/superior brain" for one of his ritual spells. Officers raided the ranch and discovered Constanzo's cauldron, which contained various items such as a dead black cat and a human brain. Fifteen mutilated corpses were dug up at the ranch, one of them Kilroy's. Officials said Kilroy was killed by Constanzo with a machete chop to the back of the neck when Kilroy tried to escape about 12 hours after being taken to the ranch.

Death 
Constanzo fled to Mexico City with four of his followers. They were only discovered when police were called to the apartment because of an unrelated dispute taking place there. As the officers approached, Constanzo, mistakenly believing they had located him, opened fire with a machine gun. This brought in police reinforcements. Determined not to go to prison, he handed the gun to follower Álvaro de León and ordered him to open fire on him and Martín Quintana. By the time police reached the apartment, both Constanzo and Quintana were dead. De León, known as "El Duby", and Sara Aldrete were immediately arrested.

A total of 14 cult members were charged with a range of crimes, from murder and drug-running to obstructing the course of justice. Sara Aldrete, Elio Hernández and Serafín Hernández were convicted of multiple murders and were ordered to serve prison sentences of over 60 years each. De León was given a 30-year term. If co-leader Aldrete is ever released from prison, American authorities plan to prosecute her for the murder of Mark Kilroy.

Possible accomplices 
 Abel Lima "El Sodomita de Iztapalapa" (alleged suspect for the kidnappings in the mid-90s).
 Rubén Estrada "Patitas Cortas"
 Christian Campos "El Panzas"
 Emmanuel Romero "El Trompas"
 Saúl Sánchez "El Macaco"
 Ricardo Peña "El Cepillín"

Documentaries 
The Discovery Channel series Most Evil, by Dr. Michael Stone, profiled Constanzo in the 10th episode ("Cult Leaders") of the second season. Constanzo's "evil level" was 22, the highest.

Constanzo was also profiled in the documentary Instinto Asesino, which aired on Discovery en Español in 2010. The episode was entitled "El Padrino".

On July 13, 2013, the Investigation Discovery Channel profiled this crime in its Poisoned Passions series. The episode is titled "Sacrificial Evil". Constanzo was portrayed by actor Aldo Uribe.

On March 1, 2018, the ID Channel series Pandora's Box: Unleashing Evil portrayed the crimes in an episode entitled "The Devil's Ranch".

Pop culture 
The song "Sacrificial Shack" by the band Pain Teens is sung from the point of view of a cult member who confesses his crimes to the police after he is captured, taking the police to the Constanzo's ranch for an explanatory tour.
Borderland is a 2007 film loosely based on Constanzo and his cult.
 Gruesome Fate, a Texas death metal band, performs a song called "Padrino de la Matamoros". It is a song about the ritual killings which is a lead track on their 2016 release.
Brujeria, a death metal band whose lyrics focus on Satanism, anti-Christianity, sex and drug smuggling, put a picture of a severed head (later nicknamed Coco Loco) on their album Matando Güeros. The head is believed to be of a victim of Adolfo Constanzo cult.
Japanese doom metal band Church of Misery reference Constanzo in their song "El Padrino" (Godfather, in Spanish). It appears on their Houses of the Unholy album, each song being about a serial killer/mass murderer.
Danish Psych Rock/Noise Rock band Narcosatanicos is allegedly named after the cult headed by Constanzo.
In the film Perdita Durango, two white American teenagers are kidnapped by Hispanic criminals (escaped from the DEA), who attempt a Santeria human sacrifice. Perdita Durango (the film) is based on the 1992 novel by Barry Gifford 59° and Raining: The Story of Perdita Durango.
An excerpt of David Kuhnlein's novella The Devil's Ranch, based on Los Narcosatánicos, is featured in issue 10 of SCAB Magazine.

Podcasts 
 "Adolfo Constanzo: The Narcosatanists & The Matamoros Cult Killings", Lights Out Podcast. March 26, 2021.
 “Adolfo Constanzo: Part 1 and Part 2” This Is Monsters January-February 2023 https://m.youtube.com/watch?v=LKCEmSN8NX0 https://m.youtube.com/watch?v=WeZZBacTnrQ
Adolfo Constanzo was the focus of the 1st episode of Unexplained Realms the podcast, titled, Devils Ranch . http://unexplainedrealms.com/
 The Last Podcast on the Left – Episodes 430-432
"Los Narcosatanicos Murders", This is Awful. February 25, 2021. https://www.thisisawfulpod.com/1435477/8026693-los-narcosatanicos-murders
Parcast Cults did a two episode story on Constanzo and the Narcosatanists, released on June 19 and 26, 2018. https://www.parcast.com/cults
"Los Narcosatanicos", Leyendas Legendarias. released on May 19, 2019. https://open.spotify.com/episode/2tOq8uTF0lERaKCd339G8Y?si=A4ASjmfASUeh8klgNUP8HA&dl_branch=1
"Narcosatanica". Released in September 2021.
https://convoynetwork.com/narcosatanica

See also 
List of serial killers by country
List of serial killers by number of victims

References

External links 
Crime Library 2 another Court TV article on the "Death Priests"
 Adolfo Constanzo at IMDb

1962 births
1989 suicides
American drug traffickers
American occultists
American people of Cuban descent
Crimes involving Satanism or the occult
Cult leaders
Deaths by firearm in Mexico
Former Roman Catholics
Male serial killers
Mexican serial killers
People from Miami
Puerto Rican people of Cuban descent
Suicides by firearm in Mexico